The Assistant Secretary of State for Economic and Business Affairs is an office in the United States Department of State responsible for managing the Bureau of Economic and Business Affairs.  It was known as the Assistant Secretary of State for Economic Affairs from December 1944 to September 15, 1972.

The purpose of the bureau is to "[promote] a strong American economy by leveling the playing field for American companies doing business in global markets, attracting foreign investors to create jobs in America, and deploying economic tools to deny financing to terrorists, human rights abusers, and corrupt officials."

Assistant Secretaries of State for Economic and Business Affairs

References

Official Website
2009-2017 Website

 
Lists of political office-holders in the United States
United States economic policy